Arlington Heights is a municipality in Cook County in the U.S. state of Illinois. Per the 2020 Census, the population was 77,676. Per the 2010 Census, it is the most populous community in the United States that is incorporated as a "village", and is the 13th most populous municipality in Illinois, although it is not far ahead of its nearby Illinois neighboring villages of Schaumburg and adjacent Palatine.

Arlington Heights is known for the former Arlington Park Race Track, home of the Arlington Million, a Breeders' Cup qualifying event; it also hosted the Breeders' Cup World Thoroughbred Championships in 2002. The village is also home to the Arlington Heights Memorial Library, which has one of the largest collections of books in the state.

History
Arlington Heights lies mostly in the western part of Wheeling Township, with territory in adjacent Elk Grove and Palatine townships, in an area originally notable for the absence of groves and trees.

Pre-Settlement History 
The land that is now the Village of Arlington Heights was controlled by the Miami Confederacy (which contained the Illini and Kickapoo tribes) starting in the early 1680s. The Confederacy was driven from the area by the Iroquois and Fox in the early 1700s.

The French-allied Potawatomi began to raid and take possession of Northern Illinois in the 1700s. In the late 1700s and early 1800s, the Potawatomi expanded southwards from their territory in Green Bay and westward from their holdings near Detroit, until they controlled in an L-shaped swath of territory from Green Bay to the Illinois River, and from the Mississippi River to the Maumee River. 

Throughout the 1830s, the Potawatomi maintained a camp in modern-day Arlington Heights that was used for six weeks out of the year as the Potawatomi migrated from their summer encampments to their winter encampments.

In 1833, the Potawatomi signed the 1833 Treaty of Chicago with the United States Government. As a result of the Treaty, the United States was granted control of all land west of Lake Michigan and east of Lake Winnebago in exchange for a tract of land west of the Mississippi. The land that is now Arlington Heights was ceded to the U.S. in this treaty, which sparked mass white immigration to the Northern Illinois area. The U.S. Government purchased the land for about 15 cents per acre, and then resold it to white settlers for 1.25 dollars per acre.

The Potawatomi would occasionally return to their holdings in Northern Illinois to honor their buried ancestors, but these return visits ended as old villages and burial sites were destroyed by settlers to make way for farming. 

The descendants of the Potawatomi who once inhabited the land that is now Arlington Heights currently live on a reservation in Mayette, Kansas.

West Wheeling 
Many prominent roads in the Arlington Heights area were built on top of Native American trails: Rand Road was built on top of a Native trail which passed by the property of Socrates Rand, who built a tavern near a crossing on the Des Plaines River. Arlington Heights Road was developed from a Native trail that ran from what was once called Naper Settlement (now Naperville) to what was once called Indian Creek (now Half Day).

Around the same time, a trading post was established in the Southwest corner of the township by Frederick T. Miner, the cabins established near Miner’s trading post came to be known as West Wheeling.

Dunton 
In 1837, Asa Dunton, a settler who built one of the first cabins in what was then known as Deer Grove, registered three land claims for himself and two sons in the land in the west of Wheeling Township.

In 1845, Asa’s eldest son, William Dunton, married Almeda Wood and brought her to the house he built beside the Potawatomi trail which then became known as Dunton’s Road (and is now known as Arlington Heights Road). West Wheeling then became known as Dunton. The town’s name changed several times before it officially became known as Arlington Heights in 1874.

William Dunton persuaded the Illinois & Wisconsin Railroad company to build track through his property. In 1853, Dunton sold 16 acres of his land to the company for $350. The first Dunton train station was built in 1854. The construction of the railroad helped to expand the population of Dunton, as it was easier for settlers to reach the village. 
By 1850, the area had largely changed its ethnic composition, as many German farmers from Saxony had arrived during the 1840s. John Klehm might serve as an example; he was at first a potato farmer, supplying the Chicago market, and in 1856 began a nursery for cherry, apple, and pear trees, later moving into spruce, maple, and elm, and then flowers. By the late 1850s the area had become noted for its truck farms, sending dairy products as well as vegetables to Chicago on the railroad.

During the Civil War, Chicago experienced a population boom, and many migrants moved to villages surrounding Chicago such as Dunton. Dunton also saw an influx of German immigration By the 1870s, Dunton’s population had surpassed 1200.

The Civil War 
Several Dunton residents served in the Civil War, however only three of those residents who left for the war returned. One of the survivors, a recently-naturalized Alsatian named Charles Sigwalt (namesake of Sigwalt Street), fought at the Battle of Chickamauga and the Battle of Kennesaw Mountain.

Warren Kennicott (namesake of Kennicott Avenue) was killed in action at the Battle of Gettysburg.

During the Civil War, Arlington Heights was a stop for many Union soldiers travelling South to fight the Confederacy or traveling North to fight in the Dakota War.

Arlington Heights 
Dunton slowly grew after the Civil War, acquiring a blacksmith, a cheese factory, a hardware store, and a hotel. In 1874, the town’s name was officially changed to Arlington Heights.

In 1878, Civil War veteran Charles Sigwalt and his brother John founded the Sigwalt Sewing Machine Company, which made 40,000 machines from the period of 1878 to 1883. The company was destroyed by a fire in 1895.

Arlington Heights was an early commuter suburb.

Religious Heritage 
The town developed religious institutions that reflected the origins of its citizens. The first churches were Presbyterian (1856) and Methodist (1858), with St. Peter Lutheran Church, a German Lutheran church, following in 1860. Today, the village has many Roman Catholics, boasting three very large churches: St. James (founded 1902—now home to 4,600 registered families), St. Edna (2,800 registered families), and Our Lady of the Wayside (3,100 registered households), in addition to several large Lutheran churches, Evangelicals and several other Protestant churches, including two United Churches of Christ, an Episcopal Church and a Christian Church (Disciples of Christ).

Arlington Park Racetrack

By the start of the 20th century Arlington Heights had about 1,400 inhabitants, and it continued to grow slowly with a good many farms and greenhouses after World War II. By then Arlington Heights was also known for Arlington Park, a racetrack founded in 1927 by the California millionaire Harry D. "Curly" Brown upon land formerly consisting of 12 farms. Camp McDonald and two country clubs were founded in the 1930s. On July 31, 1985, a fire burned down the grandstand. The current six-story grandstand was completed and opened for use June 28, 1989.

In February 2021, the track's owners, Churchill Downs Inc., announced that they would sell the site for redevelopment. In June 2021, the Chicago Bears of the National Football League emerged as prospective buyers of Arlington Park, raising speculation that they would leave Soldier Field (their current home stadium in downtown Chicago) and build a new stadium on the site, either alongside or directly atop the track. On September 29, 2021, the Bears and Churchill Downs reached a $197.2 million purchase and sell agreement for the property where the new stadium would be built.

Population increase
A population explosion took place in the 1950s and 1960s, when the spread of automobile ownership, together with the expansion of the Chicago-area economy, the baby boom, and white flight from the city, drove the number of people in Arlington Heights—expanded by a series of annexations—up to 64,884 by 1970. By then virtually all the available land had been taken up, and the formerly isolated depot stop found itself part of a continuous built-up area stretching from Lake Michigan to the Fox River.

Geography

Arlington Heights is located at  (42.094976, −87.980873).

Climate

Demographics

As of the 2020 census there were 77,676 people, 30,672 households, and 19,988 families residing in the village. The racial makeup of the village was 78.95% White, 10.77% Asian, 1.63% African American, 0.22% Native American, 0.03% Pacific Islander, 2.64% from other races, and 5.76% from two or more races. Hispanic or Latino of any race were 6.94% of the population.

There were 30,672 households, out of which 53.61% had children under the age of 18 living with them, 56.72% were married couples living together, 5.95% had a female householder with no husband present, and 34.83% were non-families. 30.04% of all households were made up of individuals, and 13.46% had someone living alone who was 65 years of age or older. The average household size was 3.07 and the average family size was 2.42.

The village's age distribution consisted of 22.9% under the age of 18, 4.7% from 18 to 24, 24.6% from 25 to 44, 28.4% from 45 to 64, and 19.6% who were 65 years of age or older. The median age was 43.4 years. For every 100 females, there were 95.4 males. For every 100 females age 18 and over, there were 91.8 males.

The median income for a household in the village was $100,221, and the median income for a family was $126,753. Males had a median income of $71,416 versus $51,319 for females. The per capita income for the village was $51,340. About 2.6% of families and 4.2% of the population were below the poverty line, including 1.6% of those under age 18 and 8.5% of those age 65 or over.

Note: the US Census treats Hispanic/Latino as an ethnic category. This table excludes Latinos from the racial categories and assigns them to a separate category. Hispanics/Latinos can be of any race.

Economy 
Arlington Heights has experienced a recent boom in development of condos, restaurants and other businesses in the Central Business District or downtown area of Arlington Heights, with restaurants experiencing the greatest overall success. Although land and space is now limited in Arlington Heights, business and community development along with community design are key concerns. The Village of Arlington Heights is also instrumental in business, residential and community development. The community is served by many fine hotels.

Top employers
According to the Village's 2017 Comprehensive Annual Financial Report, the top employers in the city are:

Arts and culture

Entertainment venues
From 1964 to 1970, Arlington Heights served as the home to The Cellar. The club was located in an unused warehouse on Davis Street, along the Chicago and Northwestern railroad tracks. Founded by local record store owner Paul Sampson, The Cellar offered live rock and blues bands for its mostly teenage audience to listen and to dance. It hosted a wealth of regional bands and repeat performers, such as The Shadows of Knight, The Mauds, H. P. Lovecraft, and Ted Nugent. It also hosted a significant array of national and international rock bands as well, including The Who, The Byrds, Buffalo Springfield, Cream, and The Spencer Davis Group.

Entertainment venues include the Metropolis Performing Arts Centre in downtown Arlington Heights, which opened in 1999. The Metropolis Performing Arts Centre includes live entertainment as well as arts education. The facility includes a 350-seat theatre, ballroom and classrooms for music and theatre. Music venue Hey Nonny opened in 2018.

Notable landmarks and establishments

Lake Arlington
Mitsuwa Marketplace - Chicago

Parks and Recreation

Education

Primary and secondary schools

Public elementary schools and middle schools that serve most of the city are operated by Arlington Heights School District 25. Portions of the city are also served by Prospect Heights School District 23, Wheeling School District 21, Elk Grove School District 59 and Community Consolidated School District 15. Seventeen elementary schools and nine middle schools serve sections of Arlington Heights.

Public high schools serving most of the community are operated by Township High School District 214. There is one public high school in the city, John Hersey High School. Other District 214 high schools serving sections of the city are: Buffalo Grove, Prospect, Rolling Meadows, and Wheeling. Portions of the city are also served by Palatine High School (Palatine, Illinois) in Township High School District 211. During peak enrollment from the 1960s to the 1980s, there were three public high schools in Arlington Heights: Hersey, Arlington High School, and Forest View High School.

Arlington High School was the original high school founded in 1922, but was closed in 1984, and is now the private Christian Liberty Academy. Forest View High School was closed in 1986, but serves as the administration center for the district. Today Arlington Heights high school students attend Rolling Meadows High School, Prospect High School, John Hersey High School and Buffalo Grove High School, with small portions attending Wheeling High School, Elk Grove High School, and Palatine High School (Palatine, Illinois).

There are also several private schools in Arlington Heights, such as St. Viator High School, Our Lady of Wayside School, St. James School, St. Peter Lutheran School and Christian Liberty Academy. Chicago Futabakai Japanese School, which offers day classes for Japanese students as well as weekend supplemental instruction, is located in Arlington Heights, in a former middle school. It moved there from Niles in 1998.

Media

The Daily Herald, the major locally owned and operated newspaper for Arlington Heights and many other Chicago suburbs
Journal & Topics, covering Arlington Heights, Buffalo Grove, Palatine, Rolling Meadows, and Wheeling.
The Correspondent, student newspaper of John Hersey High School.

Public library

The Arlington Heights Memorial Library is the public library in the village. According to the Institute of Museum & Library Services' Public Libraries Survey, in 2014, 63.5 percent of Arlington Heights residents (47,713 out of a service area population of 75,101) held library cards, entitling cardholders to borrowing privileges. For seven consecutive years, the library received a 5-star rating in Library Journal's national rating of public libraries, making it one of 21 libraries in the United States to earn five stars for the past seven years.

The library has books, magazines, CDs, DVDs and books on CD in 17 different languages. The Arlington Heights Memorial Library maintains the Arlington Heights Community Information web site. Computers are available for public use, and library card holders can also check out a laptop to use within the library. Wifi is available throughout the library.

The bookmobile stops in 29 Arlington Heights neighborhoods, delivering books, DVDs, and music. Village residents who are temporarily or permanently homebound due to an illness or physical disability may have library items brought to their homes through the Library Visitor Program. Participants may request books, audiobooks, videos, and other materials that will be delivered monthly by a library volunteer. The Library meets other special needs as well.

The library sponsors seven book discussion clubs, and two more at the Arlington Heights Senior Center in addition to a film discussion group. The library also maintains a reading room and computer room at the senior center.

Live homework help is available for students in grades 4–12 on the library's web site through Tutor.com. Ten summer volunteer squads attracted more than 250 students in 7th through 12th grade to learn life skills and teamwork. The literacy office at the library has eight computers with software to improve English skills, conversation programs and adult basic reading books. The library also offers free literacy and ESL classes in cooperation with Township High School District 214.

One Book, One Village is an annual community reading project which features a selected title an author each year, with book discussions, Meet the Author and related programs.

Transportation

Arlington Heights has two stations (Arlington Heights and Arlington Park) on Metra's Union Pacific/Northwest Line, which provides daily rail service between Harvard, Illinois and Ogilvie Transportation Center. Other nearby rail service includes the North Central Service, which stops nearby in Prospect Heights. Metra's proposed STAR line, if it were to be funded and built, would likely include a third station on the far south end of Arlington Heights. Interstate 90 and Illinois Route 53 (northern extension of Interstate 290) run along the south and western edges, respectively, of the city, providing easy access to nearby O'Hare International Airport, the city of Chicago, and other suburbs.

Arlington Heights Road is a main street running north–south through all of central Arlington Heights. Running to the south it passes through Elk Grove Village, and its southern terminus is in Itasca of DuPage County. Running north it passes through Buffalo Grove, and its northern terminus is in Long Grove of Lake County. Northwest Highway (U.S. Route 14) runs northwest–southeast through central Arlington Heights, from Chicago to Crystal Lake of McHenry County. Other major streets/roads include Rand Road (U.S. Route 12), Golf Road (Illinois Route 58), Algonquin Road (Illinois Route 62), Dundee Road (Illinois Route 68), Palatine Road, Central Road, Hintz Road, Euclid Avenue, Dunton Avenue, Campbell Street, White Oak Street, Thomas Street, Olive Street, Oakton Street, Kennicott Avenue, Ridge Avenue, Dryden Avenue and Windsor Drive.

Police Department 
The Arlington Heights Police Department has employed exactly 139 people since 2012. In 2021, 86 of those employees are officers. The 2021 budget of the Arlington Heights Police Department is $28,013,100. This a slight decrease from the biggest of $28,220,179 in 2020.

Notable people

In popular culture
The following movies were partially filmed in Arlington Heights:
 Lucas (1986) (many scenes filmed at the former Arlington High School including the former Grace Gym and Foyer)
 A Nightmare on Elm Street (2010 film) (high school scenes filmed at John Hersey High School)
 The Lucky Ones (2008)
 Normal Life (1996)
 Uncle Nino (2003)
 Bernadette (2018)
 The Founder

See also
Village of Arlington Heights v. Metropolitan Housing Development Corp. (1977 Housing discrimination Supreme Court case)

References

External links

 
 Arlington Heights Historical Museum

 
Villages in Illinois
Chicago metropolitan area
Villages in Cook County, Illinois
Villages in Lake County, Illinois
Populated places established in 1836
1887 establishments in Illinois